Kazpınarı is a village in the Amasra District, Bartın Province, Turkey. Its population is 523 (2021).

History 
The village has had the same name since 1928.

Geography 
The village is 8 km from Bartın city center and 7 km from Amasra town centre. Kuşkayası Monument is located near the village.

References

Villages in Amasra District